Steel Peak is a high peak 1.5 nautical miles (2.8 km) north of Mount Nordhill in the east ridge of the Welch Mountains of Palmer Land. Mapped by United States Geological Survey (USGS) in 1974. Named by Advisory Committee on Antarctic Names (US-ACAN) for Captain Henry E. Steel, USCG, Commanding Officer of USCGC Edisto during Operation Deep Freeze, 1969 and 1970, and Commander of the Antarctic Peninsula Ship Group, 1969.

Mountains of Palmer Land